Ephoria is a genus of moths of the Apatelodidae family. It was previously known as Colabata, as a result of Herrich-Schäffer's Synopsis familiarum Lepidopterorum—in which Ephoria was introduced—having been published twice. The earlier of these publications precedes that of Walker's Colabata in 1856, making the latter the junior synonym.

Species
Per Kitching et al. 2018, the genus contains the following species:
 Ephoria dora (Schaus, 1896)
 Ephoria eadgara (Schaus, 1934)
 Ephoria ephora (Stoll, 1781)
 Ephoria gallica Herbin, 2017
 Ephoria hezia (Druce, 1899)
 Ephoria illauta (Draudt, 1929)
 Ephoria liliana (Schaus, 1900)
 Ephoria lybia (Druce, 1898)
 Ephoria marginalis (Walker, 1856)
 Ephoria mendozata (Dognin, 1923)
 Ephoria thea (Schaus, 1924)
 Ephoria yanisi Herbin & Mielke, 2018

References

 

Apatelodidae
Moth genera